The 1828 Sanjō earthquake occurred on December 18, 1828 at Sanjo, Niigata Prefecture (then Echigo Province) in Japan. According to the official report, 21,134 houses and buildings were damaged, and 1,204 of them burned down. There were around 1,450 casualties.

Overview 

 Date : December 18, 1828
 Magnitude : 6.9 MK
 Epicenter : 
 Death toll : 1,559 (official confirmed)

References 

Earthquakes of the Edo period
1828 in Japan
1828 earthquakes
December 1828 events
1828 disasters in Japan
1828 disasters in Asia